Qin Fen (traditional Chinese: 秦奮, ; born 31 August 1991) is a Chinese rapper, singer and host. He was a member of the South Korean boy group The Legend under SS Entertainment, and is now a member of OACA Entertainment's Awaken-F.

Early life
Qin was born in Jiangxi, China on 31 August 1991. He is a good friend of fellow Hong Kong rapper, Jackson Wang.

Career

Pre-debut
Qin was a former Cube Entertainment's trainee before signing for SS Entertainment (formerly known as JK Space Entertainment) where he debuted as a member of The Legend.

2014–2017: The Legend
Qin made his debut with The Legend in 2014, where he was the vocalist of the group. They debuted with the first single, "Left Out" released on July 9, 2014. Qin left the group after it was disbanded in May 2017, after their contracts with SS Entertainment were canceled through a lawsuit.

In 2016, Qin took part in his first feature film, 我的吸血鬼大人 playing the role of "Kai Er".

2018–present: Solo activities, Idol Producer and debut with Awaken-F
After the disbandment of The Legend, Qin returned to China and signed with OACA Entertainment, where he participated in the boy band reality show, Idol Producer. He made it to the final top 20, but was eventually eliminated in the final episode.

Qin is also a host of the Chinese version of Lipstick Prince.

On 5 November 2018, Qin released his first single, "Show Me", and was peaked 11 at China V Charts. Qin also debuted with OACA Entertainment's new boy band, Awaken-F, with the rapper role.

Qin collaborated with Jackson Wang, and released the single "Another" on 19 June 2019.

Discography

Singles

Filmography

Films

Television shows

References

External links

1991 births
Living people
Singers from Jiangxi
Chinese expatriates in South Korea
K-pop singers
Korean-language singers of China
Idol Producer contestants
Chinese male singer-songwriters
Chinese male rappers
Chinese pop singers